Jeremy Raymon Pargo (born March 17, 1986) is an American professional basketball player for the Windy City Bulls of the NBA G League. In 2011 he reached the EuroLeague Final with Maccabi Tel Aviv, earning an All-EuroLeague Second Team selection in the process. He was the 2015 Israeli Basketball Premier League Assists Leader, and the 2016 Chinese Basketball Association assists leader. He is the brother of Jannero Pargo, who also played in the NBA.

Early life 
Pargo attended Chicago's Paul Robeson High School.

College career
He played college basketball for Gonzaga University's Gonzaga Bulldogs. He was voted the 2008 WCC Player of the Year in his junior season. The following year, he was featured on the cover of Sports Illustrated magazine for the 2009 March Madness issue.

Professional career

2009–10 season
After going undrafted in the 2009 NBA draft, Pargo participated in the 2009 Las Vegas NBA Summer League, as a member of the Detroit Pistons' summer league squad, alongside former Gonzaga teammate Austin Daye. He also played in the Orlando Pro Summer League for the Orlando Magic's summer league squad. He did not secure a contract, however.

In his first professional year, Pargo played for Hapoel Gilboa Galil Elyon of the Israeli Basketball Super League, averaging 14.1 points, 2.9 rebounds, 4.5 assists, and 2.7 turnovers per game. He was a home crowd favorite because of his electrifying dunks over bigger defenders. He won the 2009-10 Israeli Super League championship.

2010–11 season
In 2010, Pargo participated in the Orlando Pro Summer League for the Charlotte Bobcats, and then later in the Las Vegas NBA Summer League, as a member of the Minnesota Timberwolves. On August 26, 2010, Pargo replaced Mikhail Torrance, who was suffering from a heart condition, signing a one-year contract with EuroLeague giants Maccabi Tel Aviv. After a promising start, he emerged as one of the team's main players, especially after Doron Perkins's season-ending injury. He helped Maccabi to reach the EuroLeague Final, earning an All-EuroLeague Second Team selection in the process. His team lost in the EuroLeague Finals to Panathinaikos, by a score of 78–70.

2011–12 season
On May 24, 2011, Pargo signed a new two-year contract extension with Maccabi. However, he broke the contract, and on December 10, 2011, he signed a two-year contract with the NBA's Memphis Grizzlies, with his successful EuroLeague season not having gone unnoticed.

2012–13 season
On July 25, 2012, he was traded to the Cleveland Cavaliers, along with a 2014 second round draft pick, in exchange for D. J. Kennedy.

On January 22, 2013, Pargo was waived by the Cavaliers.

On February 7, 2013, Pargo was signed to a ten-day contract by the Philadelphia 76ers. On February 18, 2013, Pargo was signed by the 76ers for the rest of the 2012–13 season. He was waived on April 1, 2013, when the team signed Justin Holiday.

2013–14 season

In June 2013, he signed a two-year contract worth $5.2 million net income (€4 million) with the Russian club CSKA Moscow.

2014–15 season
On July 24, 2014, Pargo and CSKA Moscow reached an agreement to part ways. Later that day, Pargo signed a two-year deal with his former club Maccabi Tel Aviv.

2015–16 season
On July 4, 2015, he parted ways with Maccabi, signing with the Chinese club Zhejiang Lions for the 2015–16 CBA season.
On April 27, 2016, Pargo joined the Italian club Reyer Venezia, for the remainder of the 2015–16 season.

2016–17 season
In July 2016, Pargo signed with the Chinese club Shenzhen Leopards.

2017–18 season
On December 12, 2017, Pargo signed with the Chinese club Nanjing Monkey King.

On February 26, 2018, Pargo joined the Santa Cruz Warriors of the NBA G League. One month later, Pargo signed with the Lebanese team Champville SC. 

On April 25, 2018, Pargo returned for a third stint in Maccabi Tel Aviv, signing for the rest of the season. On May 17, 2018, Pargo recorded 26 points, scoring 20 points in the fourth quarter, along with four rebounds and four assists, leading Maccabi to a 98–95 win over Ironi Nes Ziona. He was subsequently named Israeli League Round 32 MVP. On June 8, 2018, Pargo was named 2018 Israeli League Quarterfinals MVP. Pargo made a key contribution to Maccabi's 2018 Israeli League Championship title.

2018–19 season
On July 11, 2018, Pargo signed a one-year contract extension with Maccabi Tel Aviv. Pargo won the 2019 Israeli League Championship with Maccabi, winning the Israeli League title for two consecutive years.

2019–20 season
On November 7, 2019, Pargo joined the Santa Cruz Warriors of the NBA G League for a second stint. He scored 37 points against the South Bay Lakers on December 10.

On February 8, 2020, Pargo signed a 10-day contract with the Golden State Warriors. In his debut the same day against the Lakers, Pargo appeared in an NBA game for the first time in six years, 316 days — the sixth-longest gap between game appearances in NBA history. Pargo posted 15 points in a 112-106 loss to the Phoenix Suns.

2020–21 season
On June 3, 2020, Pargo signed with Hapoel Jerusalem.

On February 15, 2021, he signed with Maccabi Rishon LeZion of the Israeli Premier League.

2021–22 season
On November 1, 2021, Pargo signed with Napoli Basket of the Italian Lega Basket Serie A (LBA). On January 10, 2022, he was traded from the Santa Cruz Warriors to the Windy City Bulls. Napoli and Pargo mutually parted ways on January 25, allowing him to return to the USA. He averaged 9.6 points and 3.6 assists per game in his tenure with the Italian team.

Return to Windy City (2023–present)
On January 1, 2023, Pargo was reacquired by the Windy City Bulls.

The Basketball Tournament
In the summer of 2017, Pargo played in The Basketball Tournament (TBT)—a single-elimination winner-take-all tournament—for team Few Good Men (Gonzaga alumni). He averaged 13.3 points per game (PPG) and helped take the team to the Super 16 round of TBT 2017, where they lost to Team Challenge ALS, 77–60. In TBT 2018, Pargo played for Overseas Elite, the three-time defending champion. In six games, he averaged 7.7 PPG, 3.3 assists per game and 2.3 rebounds per game. Overseas Elite reached the championship game and defeated Eberlein Drive, 70–58, for their fourth consecutive TBT title. In TBT 2019, Pargo and Overseas Elite advanced to the semifinals where they suffered their first-ever defeat, losing to Carmen's Crew, 71–66.

Career statistics

NBA

Regular season

|-
| style="text-align:left;"| 
| style="text-align:left;"| Memphis
| 44 || 5 || 9.6 || .333 || .263 || .596 || .8 || 1.3 || .3 || .0 || 2.9
|-
| style="text-align:left;"| 
| style="text-align:left;"| Cleveland
| 25 || 11 || 17.9 || .401 || .316 || .683 || 1.3 || 2.6 || .5 || .1 || 7.8
|-
| style="text-align:left;"| 
| style="text-align:left;"| Philadelphia
| 14 || 0 || 14.9 || .381 || .412 || .667 || 1.2 || 2.0 || .1 || .0 || 4.9
|-
| style="text-align:left;"| 
| style="text-align:left;"| Golden State
| 3 || 0 || 14.7 || .500 || .429 || .000 || 1.0 || 2.7 || .3 || .0 || 8.3
|- class="sortbottom"
| style="text-align:center;" colspan="2"| Career
| 86 || 16 || 13.1 || .379 || .319 || .644 || 1.0 || 1.8 || .3 || .0 || 4.8

EuroLeague

|-
| style="text-align:left;"| 2010–11
| style="text-align:left;"| Maccabi
| 22 || 22 || 30.0 || .463 || .363 || .676 || 3.5 || 4.3 || 1.0 || .0 || 13.0 || 12.5
|-
| style="text-align:left;"| 2013–14
| style="text-align:left;"| CSKA Moscow
| 27 || 10 || 15.4 || .452 || .257 || .652 || 1.0 || 1.4 || .4 || .1 || 5.0 || 3.4
|-
| style="text-align:left;"| 2014–15
| style="text-align:left;"| Maccabi
| 27 || 24 || style="background:#CFECEC;"|32.0 || .402 || .282 || .759 || 3.2 || 5.4 || .2 || .1 || 13.7 || 13.0
|-
| style="text-align:left;"| 2018–19
| style="text-align:left;"| Maccabi
| 11 || 2 || 19.1 || .237 || .216 || .583 || 1.7 || 2.7 || .3 || .1 || 5.5 || 1.0
|-
|- class="sortbottom"
| style="text-align:center;" colspan="2"| Career
| 87 || 58 || 24.7 || .410 || .293 || .698 || 2.4 || 3.5 || .5 || .1 || 9.8 || 8.3

References

External links
 
 Eurobasket profile
 EuroLeague profile
 FIBA profile
 Gonzaga Bulldogs bio
 

1986 births
Living people
American expatriate basketball people in China
American expatriate basketball people in Israel
American expatriate basketball people in Italy
American expatriate basketball people in Russia
American men's 3x3 basketball players
American men's basketball players
Basketball players from Chicago
Big3 players
Cleveland Cavaliers players
Golden State Warriors players
Gonzaga Bulldogs men's basketball players
Hapoel Gilboa Galil Elyon players
Israeli Basketball Premier League players
Nanjing Tongxi Monkey Kings players
Maccabi Tel Aviv B.C. players
Memphis Grizzlies players
PBC CSKA Moscow players
Philadelphia 76ers players
Point guards
Reyer Venezia players
Santa Cruz Warriors players
Shenzhen Leopards players
Undrafted National Basketball Association players
Zhejiang Lions players
United States men's national basketball team players
Napoli Basket players
Windy City Bulls players